Francisco Pérez Sierra (c. 1627 in Naples – 1709) was a Neapolitan painter of Spanish origin.  According to Antonio Palomino, he was the son of a Spanish general.  He was a disciple of Aniello Falcone and Juan de Toledo.  Numerous works that he painted included the Immaculate Conception, painted in 1655 in the convent of the Trinitarias de Madrid, Santa Ana conduciendo a la Virgen which is now at the Museo del Prado and Saint Joachim which is now at the Museo de Bellas Artes de Granada, he also painted Vase of Flowers in around 1690 (oil on panel, 62x43 cm) which is now at the Royal Palace in Madrid.

References

Antonio Palomino, An account of the lives and works of the most eminent Spanish painters, sculptors and architects, 1724, first English translation, 1739, p. 162
Palomino, Antonio (1988). El museo pictórico y escala óptica III. El parnaso español pintoresco laureado. Madrid, Aguilar S.A. de Ediciones, p. 545. .
Pérez Sánchez, Alfonso E. (1992). Baroque Paintings in Spain, 1600-1750. Madrid, Cátedra. .

External links
Biography at the Museo del Prado Online Encyclopedia 

17th-century Spanish painters
Spanish male painters
18th-century Spanish painters
18th-century Spanish male artists
1627 births
1709 deaths